Sheetal Pathak (born 23 March 1974) is an Indian former cricketer. He played four List A matches for Delhi in 1993/94.

See also
 List of Delhi cricketers

References

External links
 

1974 births
Living people
Indian cricketers
Delhi cricketers
Cricketers from Delhi